Anna Lunyova (born October 1, 1991) is a Ukrainian long jumper. She competed at the 2016 Summer Olympics in the women's long jump; her result of 6.15 meters in the qualifying round did not qualify her for the final.

References

1991 births
Living people
Ukrainian female long jumpers
Olympic athletes of Ukraine
Athletes (track and field) at the 2016 Summer Olympics
21st-century Ukrainian women